Provo Township is one of the three townships of Fall River County, South Dakota, United States; most of the rest of the county is unorganized territory. The township lies in the southwestern part of the county.

External links
Official map by the United States Census Bureau; Fall River County listed on page 10

Townships in Fall River County, South Dakota
Townships in South Dakota